Al Kavanaugh is a former politician in the province of New Brunswick, Canada.  He was elected to the Legislative Assembly of New Brunswick in 1995 and defeated for re-election by Pat Crossman in 1999.

He represented the electoral district of Riverview.

References 

New Brunswick Liberal Association MLAs
Living people
Year of birth missing (living people)
20th-century Canadian politicians